is a feminine Japanese given name. Notable people with the name include:

 a member of Maria (band)
 Ayuka Hattori, professional volleyball player
 Ayuka Suzuki, professional Japanese group rhythmic gymnast

Other people
 Ayuka Khan (1669-1724), Kalmyk leader

Japanese feminine given names